Edward Maltby (5 January 1811 – 4 December 1889) was a British civil servant of the Indian Civil Service who acted as the Governor of Madras from 26 November 1863 to 18 January 1864.

Early life 

Maltby was born in 1811 to British banker and merchant Thomas Maltby (1752–1830) and Henrietta Crichton (1770–1837). He was the seventh of the couple's eight children.

Maltby was educated at Winchester College from 1826 to 1829 and Haileybury College from 1829 to 1832. In 1832, Maltby cleared the civil service examinations and qualified for the Indian Civil Service.

Career 

Maltby served in the Madras Civil Service for thirty-two years, from 1832 to 1864. He acted as the Chief Secretary to the Government of Madras . When the Governor of Madras William Denison was appointed to act as the Viceroy of India, Maltby was appointed in his stead to function as the Governor of Madras. Maltby was nominated to the Madras Legislative Council in 1864 and served a single term.

On retirement in 1865, Maltby was offered a knighthood but he declined the offer.

Family 

Maltby married Jenny Pennycuick, daughter of John Pennycuick at Betchworth, Surrey on 12 October 1843. The couple had eleven children—seven sons and five daughters.

References 

 

1811 births
British civil servants
Governors of Madras
People educated at Haileybury and Imperial Service College
People educated at Winchester College
1889 deaths
19th-century British civil servants